The Lovers of Marianne (French: Les amoureux de Marianne) is a 1953 French comedy film directed by Jean Stelli and starring Gaby Morlay, André Luguet and Jean Debucourt.

The film's sets were designed by Raymond Gabutti.

Cast

References

Bibliography 
 Rège, Philippe. Encyclopedia of French Film Directors, Volume 1. Scarecrow Press, 2009.

External links 
 

1953 films
1953 comedy films
French comedy films
1950s French-language films
Films directed by Jean Stelli
French black-and-white films
1950s French films